Juan Riedinger is a Canadian actor. On television, he portrayed Rufus in the CBC television series The Romeo Section and Carlos Lehder in the Netflix series Narcos.  Other roles he played in television include Dodger in The CW series Riverdale, Joe Dupree in the TNT series Claws and Teo in the TNT series Good Behavior.  He is the recipient of three Leo Awards.

Early life
Riedinger was born in Banff, Alberta to a Peruvian mother and a German father.  He attended the University of Calgary.  As of December 2017, he splits his time between Los Angeles and Vancouver.

Personal life
He is married to Agam Darshi and they have twin sons.

Filmography

Film

Television

References

External links
 

Living people

Year of birth missing (living people)
21st-century Canadian male actors
Canadian male film actors
Canadian male television actors
Canadian expatriates in the United States
University of Calgary alumni
Canadian people of Peruvian descent
Canadian people of German descent